Ralf Rudolf Moeller (born Möller; ; 12 January 1959) is a German actor and former competitive bodybuilder. He is known for his roles of Brick Bardo in Cyborg, Kjartan in The Viking Sagas, the title character in the television show Conan the Adventurer, Hagen in Gladiator, Thorak in The Scorpion King, and Ulfar in Pathfinder.

Career 
Moeller began bodybuilding at age 17 and was the German national champion by 1984.

He entered his movie career in 1989 with the film Cyborg. In 1992, he appeared in Universal Soldier with Dolph Lundgren and Jean-Claude Van Damme. In 1993, he played the villain Brakus opposite Phillip Rhee and Eric Roberts in Best of the Best 2. 
Around this time he took a major neck injury in Las Vegas and had to undergo months of physiotherapy and was lucky to survive. The injury came as a result of engaging in martial arts competitions where he held his title for many years until his defeat and neck injury. After this, the competitions ceased and Moeller moved from the area retiring from all martial arts as he felt lucky to have survived.

His two biggest mainstream film roles to date are Ridley Scott's Gladiator, and 2002's The Scorpion King. Besides these two movies, he has played the leading character in The Viking Sagas, and Conan the Barbarian in the TV series Conan. The show aired in 1997–1998 with the premise that Conan, and his three sidekicks, were chosen by the god Crom to fight and vanquish the evil Hissah Zul and become king.

In both The Bad Pack (1997) and Gladiator (2000), Moeller appeared alongside fellow bodybuilder Sven-Ole Thorsen.

In 2003, he had a cameo appearance in the music video of "Maria (I Like it Loud)", by Scooter, a German techno music band.

Moeller went on to appear in El padrino (2004), sequel to The Bad Pack, once again playing Special Agent Kurt Mayers. He played Hammacher in the 2006 film Beerfest.

Filmography

Films and televisions

References

External links 
 
 

1959 births
Living people
People from Recklinghausen
German bodybuilders
20th-century German male actors
21st-century German male actors
German male film actors
German male television actors
German male voice actors
Members of the Order of Merit of North Rhine-Westphalia